Oregon NORML is the National Organization for the Reform of Marijuana Laws (NORML) affiliate for the U.S. state of Oregon.

Description and history
The chapter has had up to 3,000 dues-paying members. In 2003, Oregon NORML meetings were held at Mt. Tabor Theater. They were later held at Village Ballroom.

During Madeline Martinez's tenure as the affiliate's executive director, the chapter helped operate the World Famous Cannabis Cafe.

See also

 List of cannabis organizations

References

External links
 

Cannabis in Oregon
Cannabis organizations
National Organization for the Reform of Marijuana Laws
Organizations based in Oregon